Antikristos or Antikrystós  is a dance of Greek origin. “Aντικρυστός” in Greek language refers to the verb αντικρύζω “be across, opposite, face-to-face” (from Ancient Greek ἀντικρύ “vis-à-vis, face-to-face”). It is also known in Armenia. Antikristos has similarities with the karsilamas dance. It is danced in couples.

See also
Greek music
Kalamatianos
Kamilierikos
Syrtos
Greek dances
Greek folk music
Ballos
Horon

References

Greek dances
Greek music
Greek words and phrases
Cypriot music
Armenian dances
Assyrian dances
Bulgarian dances
Iranian dances